Don't Come Back from the Moon is a 2017 American independent drama film written and directed by Bruce Thierry Cheung. It is based on Dean Bakopoulos' 2005 novel, Please Don’t Come Back from the Moon. It stars Jeffrey Wahlberg, Alyssa Elle Steinacker, Rashida Jones, James Franco, and Henry Hopper.

The film premiered at the LA Film Festival on June 20, 2017, and was theatrically released in the United States on January 18, 2019.

Plot
Sixteen-year-old Mickey Smalley lives with his mother Eva and little brother Kolya. Their father, Roman, has become the latest in a line of men to leave the town without a trace. As his mother slips into despair, Mickey and his friends wonder what has become of their fathers.

Cast

Jeffrey Wahlberg as Mickey Smalley
Alyssa Elle Steinacker as Sonya Stecko
Rashida Jones as Eva Smalley
James Franco as Roman Smalley
Henry Hopper as Ray
Zackary Arthur as Kolya Smalley
Hale Lytle as Nick
Jeremiah Noe as Uncle John
Cheyenne Haynes as Jodie
Ambar Velazquez as Summer
Anthony Ontiveros as Val
Scott Crane as Budd Stecko

Reception
On review aggregator Rotten Tomatoes, the film holds an approval rating of 88% based on 17 reviews, with an average rating of 6.90/10. Metacritic gives the film a weighted average score of 63 out of 100, based on 8 critics, indicating "generally favorable reviews".

Joe Leydon of Variety called Don't Come Back from the Moon, "An artful and affecting mix of harshly defined specifics and impressionistic storytelling".

Rex Reed of The New York Observer called the film "very small, with a very big emotional force that unfolds through the eyes of 16-year-old [boy]", which is "sensitively played by promising newcomer Jeffrey Wahlberg".

Odie Henderson criticized the film's lack of importance, writing that "The Moon deserves better symbolism", while Sheri Linden of The Hollywood Reporter, praised the film for being "poignant and visually striking".

Writing for the Los Angeles Times, Robert Abele was quoted saying that "If Don't Come Back From the Moon isn't entirely successful, it means well as an engaged, considerate tour of a recognizably broken landscape".

According to Jeannette Catsoulis of The New York Times'', "The [film's] emotional potency is undeniable, its slow crescendo of wounded feelings and shimmering photography leaving unexpected imprints on the eyes and heart".

Accolades
2017 Woodstock Film Festival: Best Narrative Feature. Honorable Mention (win) – Bruce Thierry Cheung, Editing Award For Narrative Feature (win) – Joe Murphy

References

External links

American drama films
Films based on American novels
2017 drama films
2010s English-language films
2010s American films